Il mondo della luna (The World of the Moon) is an opera (dramma giocoso) in 3 acts by Baldassare Galuppi. The Italian-language libretto was by Carlo Goldoni. It premiered on 29 January 1750 at the Teatro San Moisè, Venice.

The music has been described as "clear, with expressivity obtained through melodic and textural changes." Galuppi's music exploits "the capacity of the music to illustrate and portray the text," with special attention for Buonafede, credulous old man who is the central character of the plot.

The opera by Galuppi is the first based on Goldoni's libretto. The same libretto was later also set by several other composers, such as Pedro António Avondano (1765), Giovanni Paisiello  (1774 under the title Il credulo deluso, 1783), Gennaro Astarita (1774), Joseph Haydn (1777),  (1790, libretto revised by Domenico Somigli), and Marcos Portugal (1791, in Portuguese, under the title O lunático iludido). Paisiello composed four different versions of operas based on this libretto (one of them, 1783, was a reduction in two acts by Marco Coltellini; another, 1774, was performed as Il credulo deluso).

Roles

Synopsis
See synopsis in Haydn's Il mondo della luna.

Recordings

References
Notes

Sources

 (reproduced online at Opera Manager)

External links

Operas by Baldassare Galuppi
Italian-language operas
Operas
Drammi giocosi
1750 operas
Libretti by Carlo Goldoni
Science fiction operas
Operas set on the Moon